Dianne Mary Holum (born May 19, 1951) is a retired American speed skater.

In 1966, Holum became the youngest person to compete in the world speed skating championships. Next year she won bronze at the World Allround Championships. At the age of 16, Holum earned a silver medal in the 500 meter race at the 1968 Winter Olympics, finishing in a three way tie for second place. Holum added a bronze medal in the 1000 meter event.

At the 1972 Winter Olympics, Holum won a gold medal in the 1500 meter event, setting an Olympic record in the process. After finishing sixth in the 1000 meter race, Holum ended her Olympic career by winning a silver medal on the 3000 meters.

After winning bronze once more at the World Allround Championships later that same year, Holum retired from speed skating, only 20 years old. The following year, she began her career as a coach, helping put a 14-year-old Eric Heiden on the road to the 1980 Winter Olympics, where he won five gold medals. She also coached Eric's sister Beth Heiden. At the 1976 Olympics, she became the first female coach to a female speed skater.

For her achievements as a speed skater, Holum was inducted in the National Speedskating Hall of Fame in 1986. For her achievements as a coach, Holum was inducted in the International Women's Sports Hall of Fame in 1996. She also coached her daughter Kirstin Holum, who was Junior World Allround Champion in 1997 and participated in the 1998 Winter Olympics.

References

External links

Dianne Holum at SkateResults.com
Olympic Speed Skating Medalists with Wisconsin Ties. Wisconsin Historical Society. Retrieved on 2007-08-30.

1951 births
Living people
American female speed skaters
American Olympic coaches
Speed skaters at the 1968 Winter Olympics
Speed skaters at the 1972 Winter Olympics
Medalists at the 1968 Winter Olympics
Medalists at the 1972 Winter Olympics
Olympic gold medalists for the United States in speed skating
Olympic silver medalists for the United States in speed skating
Olympic bronze medalists for the United States in speed skating
Speed skaters from Chicago
World Allround Speed Skating Championships medalists
21st-century American women